"Sherry" is a song written by Bob Gaudio and recorded by The Four Seasons.

Song information
According to Gaudio, the song took about 15 minutes to write and was originally titled "Jackie Baby" (in honor of then-First Lady Jacqueline Kennedy).  In a 1968 interview, Gaudio said that the song was inspired by the 1961 Bruce Channel hit "Hey! Baby".

At the studio, the name was changed to "Terri Baby", and eventually to "Sherry", the name of the daughter of Gaudio's best friend, New York DJ Jack Spector. One of the names that Gaudio pondered for the song was "Peri Baby", which was the name of the record label for which Bob Crewe worked, named after the label owner's daughter.

The single's B-side was "I've Cried Before". Both tracks were included in the group's subsequent album release, Golden Hits of the 4 Seasons (1963).

Charts

Certifications

Reception 
"Sherry" was the band's first nationally released single and their first number one hit, reaching the top of the U.S. Billboard Hot 100 on September 15, 1962. It remained at number one for five consecutive weeks, and number one on the R&B charts for one week. "Sherry" became the first single by The Four Seasons to go to number one on the R&B charts.

Cover versions
A version of the song was later recorded and released by British singer/songwriter Adrian Baker. It was released in July 1975 along with "I Was Only Fooling" on the Magnet Records label (MAG 34). 
A version by Robert John entered Billboard'''s Hot Top 100 chart at position number 82 on October 25, 1980; it spent five weeks on the Top 100, peaking at number 70 on November 8, 1980.
One version of the song was recorded by British pop group Dreamhouse, which appears on their debut album, and was released in 1998.

Song in popular culture
The song appears on the soundtrack album of the films; Stealing Home (1988) and The Help (2011), as well as a television episode of Two and a Half Men.
In The Marvellous Wonderettes'', Missy takes the lead on the song with the Wonderettes singing backup. At the climax of the song, Missy hits a Phantom of the Opera-esque high note, the ending similar to the Jersey Boys version.

References

1962 singles
Billboard Hot 100 number-one singles
Cashbox number-one singles
The Four Seasons (band) songs
Robert John songs
Songs written by Bob Gaudio
Vee-Jay Records singles
Song recordings produced by Bob Crewe
1962 songs